The Camunic language is an extinct language that was spoken in the 1st millennium BC in the Valcamonica and the Valtellina in Northern Italy, both in the Central Alps. The language is sparsely attested to an extent that makes any classification attempt uncertain - even the discussion of whether it should be considered a pre–Indo-European or an Indo-European language has remained indecisive. Among several suggestions, it has been hypothesized that Camunic is related to the Raetic language from the Tyrsenian language family, or to the Celtic languages.

Language

The extant corpus is carved on rock. There are at least 170 known inscriptions, the majority of which are only a few words long. The writing system used is a variant of the north-Etruscan alphabet, known as the Camunian alphabet or alphabet of Sondrio. Longer inscriptions show that Camunic writing used boustrophedon.

Its name derives from the people of the Camunni, who lived during the Iron Age in Valcamonica and were the creators of many of the stone carvings in the area. Abecedariums found in Nadro and Piancogno have been dated to between 500 BC and 50 AD.

The amount of material is insufficient to fully decipher the language. Some scholars think it may be related to Raetic and to Etruscan, but it is considered premature to make such affiliation. Other scholars suggest that Camunic could be a Celtic or another unknown Indo-European language.

Transliteration

Gallery

See also
Camunni
Rock Drawings in Valcamonica
Val Camonica

References

Bibliography 
Mancini, Alberto. 1980. "Le iscrizioni della Valcamonica" in Studi Urbinati di storia, filosofia e letteratura. Supplemento linguistico 2, pp. 75–166.
Mancini, Alberto. 1991. "Iscrizioni retiche e iscrizioni camune. Due ambiti a confronto" in Quaderni del Dipartimento di Linguistica, Università degli studi di Firenze 2, pp. 77–93.
Marchesini, Simona. 2011. "Alla ricerca del modello perduto. Sulla genesi dell’alfabeto camuno", Palaeohispanica 11, pp. 155-171
Markey, Thomas L. 2008. "Shared symbolics, genre difusion, token perceptions and late literacy in North-western Europe" in NOWELE 54/55, pp. 5–62. 
Morandi, Alessandro. 2004. Epigrafia e lingua dei Celti d'Italia, vol. II. Celti d’Italia, ed. by Paola Piana Agostinetti (Popoli e civiltà dell'Italia antica, 12), Roma 2004
Prosdocimi, Aldo Luigi. 1965. "Per un'edizione delle iscrizioni della Valcamonica", in Studi Etruschi 33, pp. 574–599.
Schumacher, Stefan. 2007. "Val Camonica, Inschriften" in Reallexikon der germanischen Altertumskunde. Band 35: Speckstein bis Zwiebel. Ed. Heinrich Beck et al., Berlin – New York, pp. 334–337.
Tibiletti Bruno, Maria Grazia. 1978. "Camuno, retico e pararetico", in Lingue e dialetti dell'Italia antica ('Popoli e civiltà dell'Italia antica', 6), ed. by A. L. Prosdocimi, Roma 1978, pp. 209–255.
Tibiletti Bruno, Maria Grazia. 1990. "Nuove iscrizioni camune" in Quaderni camuni 49-50, pp. 29–171.
Tibiletti Bruno, Maria Grazia. 1992. "Gli alfabetari" in Quaderni camuni 60, pp. 309–380.

External links

 
 
 
 
 
 

Languages of ancient Italy
Unclassified languages of Europe
Languages attested from the 1st millennium BC
Languages extinct in the 1st millennium BC